Wilf Rosenberg (18 June 1934 – 14 January 2019) was a South African rugby union and rugby league footballer who played in the 1950s and 1960s.

Career
Born in South Africa, Rosenberg moved to Australia as a child and started playing rugby union while a pupil at Sydney Grammar School.  As a teenager he returned to South Africa and played for his local school, Jeppe High School in Johannesburg, before playing for the Transvaal provincial team.  Picked five times for the South Africa national rugby union team between 1955 and 1958 in which he scored two tries, Rosenberg moved to the United Kingdom and changed codes to become a professional rugby league player while studying dentistry at Leeds University.

Rosenberg was signed by Leeds for a £6,000 signing-on fee and made his début in 1959. He made 81 appearances for Leeds scoring 73 tries.

Known as "the Flying Dentist" Rosenberg left Leeds in 1961 after breaking his jaw and joined Hull F.C. for whom he played 86 times scoring 42 tries before retiring from the game in 1963.

After retiring from rugby Rosenberg returned to South Africa where he established his own dental practice before a stroke ended his dental career in 1970.  After this Rosenberg turned his hand to other pursuits including boxing promotion.  He eventually retired to Israel and died in Herzliya from another stroke on 14 January 2019.

Rosenberg had been inducted into the International Jewish Sports Hall of Fame in 1994.

References

External links
 Wilf Rosenberg on International Jewish Sports Hall of Fame

1934 births
Expatriate rugby league players in England
Hull F.C. players
Jewish rugby league players
Jewish rugby union players
Leeds Rhinos players
2019 deaths
South Africa international rugby union players
South African expatriate rugby league players
South African expatriate sportspeople in England
South African Jews
South African rugby league players
South African rugby union players
Rugby union players from Cape Town
Rugby league wingers
South African dentists
Alumni of the University of Leeds
20th-century dentists
Rugby union centres